Kłębowiec  is a village in the administrative district of Gmina Wałcz, within Wałcz County, West Pomeranian Voivodeship, in north-western Poland.

References

External links 

 Website about Landkreis Deutsch Krone with information about some cities and villages (German)

Villages in Wałcz County